The 1947 NFL season was the 28th regular season of the National Football League. The league expanded the regular season by one game from eleven games per team to twelve, a number that remained constant for fourteen seasons, through 1960.

The season ended when the Chicago Cardinals defeated the Philadelphia Eagles in the NFL Championship Game on December 28.

Draft
The 1947 NFL Draft was held on December 16, 1946 at New York City's Commodore Hotel. With the first pick, the Chicago Bears selected halfback Bob Fenimore from Oklahoma State University–Stillwater.

Major rule changes
A fifth official, the Back Judge, is added to the officiating crew.
When a team has fewer than 11 players on the field prior to a snap or kick, the officials are not to notify them.
An illegal use of hands penalty will be called whenever a defensive player uses them to block the vision of a receiver during any pass behind the offensive team's line.
During an unsuccessful extra point attempt, the play becomes dead as soon as failure is evident.
Roughing the kicker will not be called if he kicks after recovering a loose ball or fumble on the play.
All teams are required to use prescribed standard yardage chains, down boxes, and flexible shaft markers.
Games are no longer played on Tuesdays.

Division races
Starting in 1947, the NFL teams played a 12-game schedule rather than the previous 11 games. The twelfth game proved to be crucial for the Steelers, Eagles, Cardinals and Bears.  

In the Eastern Division, Pittsburgh took a half-game lead over Philadelphia after a 35–24 win in Week Five. 

In Week Eleven, the Eagles won the rematch, 21–0, to take a 7–3–0 to 7–4–0 lead, while the Cardinals lost to the Giants, 35–31, and the Bears beat Detroit 34–14, leaving the 7–3–0 Cards a game behind the 8–2–0 Bears in the Western Division.

In Week Twelve, the Cardinals beat the Eagles, 45–21, and Pittsburgh beat Boston 17–7, but the Bears lost to the Rams, 17–14. 

The Steelers finished at 8–4, leaving the 7–4 Eagles needing to win their last game, while the Bears and Cardinals were both at 8–3, making the Bears-Cardinals game the following week a de facto playoff for the Western title: a tie would force a second playoff game between them.

In Week Thirteen, Philadelphia beat Green Bay 28–14 to force a playoff with Pittsburgh for the Eastern title, while before a sold-out crowd of 48,632 at Wrigley Field, the Cardinals beat the Bears 30–21 to win the Western title and the right to host the Championship Game.

Final standings

Playoffs

Home team in capitals
Eastern Division Playoff Game
Philadelphia 21, PITTSBURGH 0
NFL Championship Game
CHI. CARDINALS 28, Philadelphia 21

League leaders

Coaching changes
Boston Yanks: Herb Kopf was replaced by Maurice J. "Clipper" Smith.
Los Angeles Rams: Adam Walsh was replaced by Bob Snyder.

Footnotes

Further reading

NFL Record and Fact Book
NFL History 1941–1950 (Last accessed December 4, 2005)
Total Football: The Official Encyclopedia of the National Football League
 Pro Football Illustrated: 1948 Edition. (Mt. Morris, IL: Elbak Publishing Co., 1948).

1947